Franz-Josef Overbeck (born 19 June 1964) is a German bishop of the Catholic Church who has been bishop of Essen since 2009 and bishop of the German military since 2011.

Biography 
Franz-Josef Overbeck was born on 19 June 1964 in Marl. 

Overbeck studied theology and philosophy at University of Münster and at Collegium Germanicum et Hungaricum in Rome. He was ordained a priest on 10 October 1989. 

In 18 July 2007, Pope Benedict XVI named him titular bishop of Mathara in Numidia and auxiliary bishop of Münster. He received his episcopal consecration on 1 September 2007 from Bishop Reinhard Lettmann of Münster. He was apostolic administrator of the diocese from Lettman's retirement in March 2008 until the installation of his successor in March 2009.

On 28 October 2009, Pope Benedict appointed him bishop of Essen. By this time he had been diagnosed with cancer and treated successfully. He was installed there on 20 December. At the time he was the youngest bishop to lead a diocese in Germany.

In 2010 Overbeck was appointed Church assistant to the foundation Centesimus Annus Pro Pontifice (CAPP). The lay-managed foundation promotes Catholic social teaching.

On 24 February 2011, Overbeck was given the additional responsibility of bishop of the Military Ordinariate of Germany; he was installed on 6 May.

Pope Francis named him a member of the Pontifical Commission for Latin America on 15 January 2014  and of the Pontifical Council for Culture on 29 March.

In March 2018 he was elected the bishop delegate of the German Bishops Conference to the Commission of the Bishops’ Conferences of the European Union (COMECE). He was elected one of COMECE's vice president's later that year.

Positions 
In January 2019, Overbeck said there should be reforms in Roman Catholic sexual ethics and that same-sex marriages should be accepted and not be described as immoral. In October 2019, Overbeck said that many Catholics do not understand why women cannot be Roman Catholic deacons or priests and that the ordination of women in the Catholic Church should be allowed. In December 2019, Overbeck said there should be exceptions from clerical celibacy in the Catholic Church. In December 2022, Overbeck said homosexual parents can be good parents.

Selected works 
 2017: Freude und Hoffnung, Ostfildern: Matthias Grünewald Verlag
 2018: Einstehen für unsere Demokratie, Cologne: J.P. Bachem Medien

References

External links

 
 
 
  interview with Overbeck over war in Afghanistan

1964 births
People from Marl, North Rhine-Westphalia
21st-century German Roman Catholic bishops
Living people
Roman Catholic bishops of Essen
21st-century Roman Catholic bishops in Germany